David Hartsough (born May 2, 1940) is an American Quaker peace activist. Formerly a long-time employee of the American Friends Service Committee, he is a co-founder of the Nonviolent Peaceforce.  

Hartsough's parents were active in the peace movement. He embarked on his life's work after meeting Martin Luther King Jr. in 1956 when he was a student at Westtown School, a Quaker school in West Chester, Pennsylvania. Hartsough received his BA from Howard University and his MA from Columbia University in International Relations.

He has been involved in the civil rights and anti-Vietnam War movements. He worked 18 years for peace and justice with the American Friends Service Committee. Hartsough has engaged in nonviolent peacemaking in the US, Kosovo, the former Soviet Union, Mexico, Guatemala, El Salvador, Nicaragua and the Philippines, Sri Lanka, Iran and Palestine and Israel. 

Hartsough is the executive director of Peaceworkers, based in San Francisco. In 2002, he co-founded the Nonviolent Peaceforce; he was also a co-founder, in 2014, of World Beyond War. 

With Joyce Hollyday, Hartsough co-authored Waging Peace: Global Adventures of a Lifelong Activist, 2014.  

Hartsough received the USF Institute for Nonviolence and Social Justice (INSJ)’s 2021 Clarence B. Jones Award in Kingian Nonviolence.

He had myelodysplastic syndrome (MDS) in 2020. In October 2020, he was diagnosed with Myelofibrosis and receiving chemotherapy.

Hartsough resides with his spouse Jan in San Francisco, California. He has two children and four grandchildren.

See also 
 List of peace activists

References

External links 
 David Hartsough Facebook
 David Hartsough Papers  Swarthmore College Peace Collection Library

1940 births
Living people
American anti-war activists
American Quakers
Activists from San Francisco